Lumper may refer to:

 Lumpers and splitters, slang for one who takes a gestalt view of a definition in various fields such as history, linguistics, software engineering, taxonomy, or liturgical studies
 A stevedore who unloads fish at British fishing ports, or formerly in Australia anyone engaged in loading and unloading ships' cargo
 Slang for a person who loads/unloads a semi-trailer 

As a proper noun, Lumper may refer to:
 Gottfried Lumper (1747–1800), German Benedictine patristic writer
 An Irish Lumper, a waxy potato whose vulnerability to blight resulted in mid-19th century famines

See also
 Lumpenproletariat